The Sacrifice (German: Das Opfer) is a 1918 German silent drama film directed by Joe May and starring Mia May, Harry Liedtke and Anton Edthofer.

Cast
 Mia May as Maria 
 Fritz Westfried
 Anton Edthofer
 Ernst Dernburg
 Elga Hess
 Hans Mierendorff
 Harry Liedtke
 Maria West
 Lina Paulsen

References

Bibliography
 Hans-Michael Bock & Claudia Lenssen. Joe May: Regisseur und Produzent. 1991.

External links

1918 films
Films of the German Empire
German silent feature films
Films directed by Joe May
German war drama films
1918 drama films
UFA GmbH films
German black-and-white films
Films set on the German home front during World War I
1910s war drama films
Silent war drama films
1910s German films
1910s German-language films